The 2022 Open Quimper Bretagne was a professional tennis tournament played on hard courts. It was the thirteenth edition of the tournament which was part of the 2022 ATP Challenger Tour. It took place in Quimper, France between 24 and 30 January 2022.

Singles main-draw entrants

Seeds

1 Rankings as of 17 January 2022.

Other entrants
The following players received wildcards into the singles main draw:
  Gilles Simon
  Jo-Wilfried Tsonga
  Luca Van Assche

The following players received entry from the qualifying draw:
  Evan Furness
  Andrey Kuznetsov
  Shintaro Mochizuki
  Hiroki Moriya
  Alexandre Müller
  Tim van Rijthoven

The following player received entry as a lucky loser:
  Andrea Arnaboldi

Champions

Singles

 Vasek Pospisil def.  Grégoire Barrère 6–4, 3–6, 6–1.

Doubles

 Albano Olivetti /  David Vega Hernández def.  Sander Arends /  David Pel 3–6, 6–4, [10–8].

References

2022 ATP Challenger Tour
2022
January 2022 sports events in France